Yulia Sergeyevna Leskina (born 9 February 1991) is a Russian ice hockey goaltender and former member of the Russian national ice hockey team.

International career
Leskina was selected to represent Russia in the 2014 Winter Olympics. She played in two games, winning both, and making twenty-eight saves on thirty shots.

As of 2014, Leskina has also appeared for Russia at one IIHF Women's World Championships. Playing one period as Russia won a bronze medal in 2013.

Leskina made two appearances for the Russia women's national under-18 ice hockey team, at the IIHF World Women's U18 Championships. The first came in 2008.

Career statistics

International career
Through 2013-14 season

References

External links
 
 

1991 births
Living people
People from Pervouralsk
Olympic ice hockey players of Russia
Ice hockey players at the 2014 Winter Olympics
Russian women's ice hockey goaltenders
Universiade medalists in ice hockey
Universiade gold medalists for Russia
Competitors at the 2015 Winter Universiade
Sportspeople from Sverdlovsk Oblast